Putaani Party (Kannada: ಪುಟಾಣಿ ಪಾರ್ಟಿ, English: The Kid Gang) is a 2009 Kannada language feature film. Produced by Children's Film Society, India, the film was shot in a village called Honnapura situated near the town of Dharwad in South India. The film uses local actors, most of them first timers who are new to the medium of films. The film has a particular dialect of Kannada that is spoken by a few in that part of India.

This film has been scripted and directed by Ramchandra PN, a graduate of the Film and Television Institute of India, Pune. His earlier film Suddha had won the best Indian film at the Osian's Cinefan Festival of Asian Films, New Delhi, 2007. Putaani Party is his second feature film and his first in Kannada language.

Plot

A Gram Panchayat (village governing body) in rural India facilitates the functioning of the Makkala Samiti (Children’s Committee) – a children’s body elected by the children themselves.

The committee acts as a pressure group in trying to get the local governance react to various social issues that it raises. Guided by a sympathetic school teacher, the children’s honesty and persistency ruffles many feathers among the adults, some of whom have been using the ‘Makkala Samiti’ for their own needs.

What follows is a subtle cat and mouse game, by the end of which the children hope to get their voice heard.

The film subtly speaks about the Children's rights to self governance and the pathetic attitude we adults have towards this issue.

Awards

The film has won the Swarna Kamal (Golden Lotus) for the 57th National Film Award for Best Children's Film for the year 2009 constituted by the Government of India.

Film festival participation

The Global Film Festival of Indore, India, 2009
The Mumbai International Film Festival for Children, India, 2009
Kolkata Film Festival, India, 2009
Istanbul Children's Film Festival, Turkey, 2009
Bangladesh Children's Film Festival, Bangladesh
The Cairo International Film Festival for Children, Egypt, 2010
CMS Children's Film Festival, Lucknow, India, 2010 
Bengaloru Habba Children's Film Festival, Bengaluru, India 2010
International Children's Film Festival of Iran, 2010

Cast

Ranjita Jadhav as Geeta
Pavan Hanchinaal as Gaarya
Sharat Anchatgiri as Anil
Gurudutta Joshi as Chandru
Deepak Joshi as Hussain
Bhavani Prakash Babu as Neelu Teacher
Jayalaxmi Patil as Nancy 
CS Patil as Deshpande
Mukund Maigur as Health Minister
 
(Source: Upperstall.com)

Controversies
Putaani Party was dragged into a controversy that was not of its own making, when one jury member of the National Film Awards revealed some bit of the jury deliberations to the press in Kerala. He claimed that Kesu the joint winner of the award was based on one of his earlier films, but claimed responsibility for Kesu jointly getting the award. Also, the jury member revealed that because no single film deserved the National Award for Best Children's Film, it was given to two films.

References

External links
 
Director's Interview at Rediff.com
News on a film Portal
Children's Film Society

Indian children's films
2000s Kannada-language films
2009 films
Children's rights
Films shot in Karnataka
Best Children's Film National Film Award winners
Films directed by Ramchandra P. N.